Cut Loose is the 1983 debut solo album by Paul Rodgers (of Free and Bad Company fame). Unlike his other work, Paul Rodgers plays all the instruments on this album. It was recorded at his house in Kingstone.

The song "Live In Peace" was re-recorded by his next band The Firm on their second album Mean Business. "Superstar Woman" was originally an unreleased Bad Company song and was re-recorded by Rodgers for this album (the original version was eventually released on The 'Original' Bad Co. Anthology in 1999). The album peaked at #135 on the Billboard's 200 chart.

Track listing
All songs written by Paul Rodgers
 "Fragile" - 4:45
 "Cut Loose" - 3:37
 "Live in Peace" - 5:01
 "Sweet Sensation" - 3:18
 "Rising Sun" - 4:08
 "Boogie Mama" - 3:11
 "Morning After The Night Before" - 4:15
 "Northwinds" - 3:58
 "Superstar Woman" - 5:00
 "Talking Guitar Blues" - 4:05

Personnel
 Paul Rodgers - bass, guitar, drums, keyboards, vocals, producer, liner notes
Technical
 John Herdt - artwork, design
 Julian Mendelsohn - engineer
 Joe Reagoso - liner notes, reissue producer, remastering

References

Paul Rodgers albums
1983 debut albums
Atlantic Records albums